A list of films produced in Egypt in 1947. For an A-Z list of films currently on Wikipedia, see :Category:Egyptian films.

External links
 Egyptian films of 1947 at the Internet Movie Database
 Egyptian films of 1947 elCinema.com

Lists of Egyptian films by year
1947 in Egypt
Lists of 1947 films by country or language